General elections were held in Lebanon on 29 August 1943, with a second round in some constituencies on 4 September. Independent candidates won the majority of seats. Voter turnout was 50.9%.

Results

References

Lebanon
1943 in Lebanon
Elections in Lebanon
Election and referendum articles with incomplete results